Tahil is a remote desert village in Sharjah, United Arab Emirates. 

The small community of Tahil is connected to Sharjah by a road, constructed in 2014, linking Tahil with the Al Rafiya and Al Zubair roads. Consisting of a small collection of houses and a mosque, Tahil's road network is lit by 140 solar lights, installed by Sharjah Electricity and Water Authority (SEWA) in 2017.

References

Populated places in the Emirate of Sharjah